The Center for Feminist Social Studies (CFS) is a research centre at Örebro University in Sweden with a thematic focus on "gender, society and change," and one of Sweden's leading gender studies research institutions. It co-hosts the GEXcel International Collegium for Advanced Transdisciplinary Gender Studies, originally established as an international centre of excellence in gender studies based at Örebro and Linköping by the Swedish Research Council in 2006.

Academics
Anna G. Jónasdóttir
Liisa Husu
Jeff Hearn
Maria Jansson

References

Örebro University